The title of BTCC champion is awarded to the driver who scores the most points overall in a British Touring Car Championship season. From 1992 to present a separate championship was awarded to the winning 'independent' (not officially manufacturer backed) driver, and from 2000 to 2003 the Production class had its own championship for the best 'class B' driver.

Drivers' Championship winners

Independents' Championship winners

Notes

  - The Independent's championship was not officially awarded in 2001. Erdos was the leading non-works driver, although he did not receive a title or trophy.
  - Team changed name to Total Motor Sport Racing mid-season

Production class championship winners

Jack Sears Trophy winners

Manufacturers'/Constructors' Championship winners

Lombank Saloon Car Championship Entrants' Trophy winners

Teams' Championship winners

References

 Official BTCC Website

Auto racing lists